Gavin Harrison Yates was Anglican  Dean of Nelson from 1970  until 1981.

Yates was educated at the University of Canterbury and  ordained in 1962. His first post was a  curacy at Saint Paul's Cathedral, Wellington. He was Assistant Director of the Diocese of Wellington’s Christian Education Council then Vicar of Westport before his appointment as Dean. Yates was also  interim Dean of Dunedin during 2008.

References

Deans of Nelson
University of Canterbury alumni